This is the most recent list of Australian states and territories by gross state product (GSP) and GSP per capita. Also included are the GSP and population growth tables as well as a comparison table showing the surplus/deficit between state final demand (SFD) and GSP for the same financial year. All the data was taken from the Australian Bureau of Statistics website.

States and territories by GSP per capita

States and territories by GSP growth and share of national economy

States and territories by population growth

States and territories by comparison between SFD and GSP

Historical gross state product (since 1989–90)

See also 
 Economy of Australia
 Home ownership in Australia
 Median household income in Australia and New Zealand
 States and territories of Australia

References 

Gross state product
Gross State Productc
Gross state product
GSP, Australia
Economy of Australia-related lists
Australia